The Paper Chase is a 1978 American drama television series based on the 1971 novel of the same name by John Jay Osborn Jr., and a 1973 film adaptation. It follows the lives of law student James T. Hart and his classmates at an unnamed law school, modeled on Harvard Law School.

Plot overview

Season 1
James T. Hart is a law student from rural Minnesota who enters the intensely competitive environment of a prestigious law school specifically to study with Professor Charles W. Kingsfield, the world's leading authority on contract law. Kingsfield inspires both awe and fear in his students in his unremitting determination to prepare them for the practice of law.

To cope with the heavy workload, Hart joins a study group organized by Franklin Ford III. Ford is under immense pressure to succeed. His family has produced an unbroken string of outstanding lawyers going back generations, culminating in his demanding father, the senior partner in a very prestigious Wall Street law firm. The study group includes smooth woman-chaser Thomas Craig Anderson, slob Willis Bell, idealistic activist Elizabeth Logan, and struggling Jonathan Brooks, who is married to Asheley. Brooks drops out after he voluntarily confesses to cheating.

Hart works part-time at Ernie's Tavern to help pay his way through school. In the pilot, a waitress (Marilu Henner) shows him the ropes.

There was a four-year hiatus between the end of the first season and the start of the second.

Season 2
Hart survives the first year with flying colors and joins the staff of the student-published Law Review (an honor reserved for the top students), under the leadership of Gerald Golden. He becomes romantically involved with first-year law student Connie Lehman, only to lose her when she wins a Rhodes Scholarship and goes to Oxford University. Later, he repeatedly clashes with Law Review rival Rita Harriman, herself a brilliant student, though he admits to Ford that he is perversely attracted to her.

Season 3
Hart is now the president of the Law Review. The new students include Ford's younger brother Tom and former housewife Rose Samuels. The Ford brothers have to come to terms with their sibling rivalry. Rose deals with a surprise divorce and being so much older than her classmates.

Season 4
This season consists of only six episodes, including a two-part finale in which Hart has to decide between taking a federal court clerkship or a position in a small private firm with idealistic goals after graduation. His decision is further complicated when he is invited to apply for a newly vacant faculty position at the school, an option opposed by Kingsfield, who believes he lacks the necessary experience. Hart, the top student in the graduating class, gives the commencement speech, bringing the series to a close.

Cast
Ordered by number of credited episodes; only actors with eight or more episodes are listed.

Production

Development
The CBS television network aired the series in the 1978–1979 season. John Houseman reprised his movie role, and James Stephens played Hart. Despite extensive critical praise, ratings were low and it was cancelled after one year; PBS subsequently rebroadcast all of the episodes. In 1983, cable network Showtime brought back the show with both Houseman and Stephens, as well as some other members of the original television cast. At the end of the fourth season, Hart finally graduates from law school.

Theme music
In the first year, the theme song was "The First Years", written by Norman Gimbel and Charles Fox, and performed by Seals and Crofts. In the pilot, the opening used an instrumental version, and the ending used a different vocal version. Starting in the second year, a classical instrumental piece replaced it.

Opening narrative
In the first year, the program opens with Professor Kingsfield, in class, saying, "The study of law is something new and unfamiliar to most of you—unlike any other schooling you have ever known before."  After the theme song, he continues: "You teach yourselves the law but I train your minds. You come in here with a skull full of mush, and, if you survive, you leave thinking like a lawyer."

Pilot episode 
The pilot episode had a different opening credits sequence which featured an instrumental version of the theme song, omitted Professor Kingsfield's opening narrative, and introduced the characters through the use of the class seating chart. It also featured a different female character, Linda O'Connor (played by Katharine Dunfee Clarke).

Episodes

Awards
The show won the CableACE Award for Best Dramatic Series in 1985 and 1987.

Home media
Shout! Factory has released the four seasons on DVD in Region 1.

Broadcast

Syndication
In the late 1980s, The Family Channel rebroadcast the entire series in a late-night time slot, at midnight Eastern Time. The series was later seen in the early 1990s on A&E, and in the early 2000s on GoodLife Television.

International broadcast
The series aired in the UK on BBC Two, in Venezuela (Alma Mater) and Colombia. The series aired on CBC TV 8 in Barbados in the 1980s.
The series aired in South Africa, around the early 80's. It was dubbed into Afrikaans, and titled "Beste Professor", which, in English, means "Dear Professor".

References

External links

1978 American television series debuts
1970s American legal television series
1980s American legal television series
1986 American television series endings
1970s American college television series
CBS original programming
English-language television shows
PBS original programming
Showtime (TV network) original programming
Live action television shows based on films
Television shows based on American novels
Television series by 20th Century Fox Television
American television series revived after cancellation
Television shows set in Massachusetts
Universities and colleges in art
1980s American college television series